Dafna D. Gladman, MD, FRCPC, is a Canadian doctor and medical researcher working in the fields of psoriatic arthritis, systemic lupus erythematosus, and rheumatoid arthritis. She is a professor at the University of Toronto Faculty of Medicine and Senior Scientist at the Krembil Research Institute. She is Deputy Director, Centre for Prognosis Studies in the Rheumatic Diseases (part of the University Health Network Arthritis and Autoimmunity Research Centre), Co-Director, Lupus Clinic, Toronto Western Hospital (TWH) and Director, Psoriatic Arthritis Program, Toronto Western Hospital.

Education 
Gladman received her M.D. from the University of Toronto in 1971. She completed her post‐graduate training in Rheumatology at the University of Toronto and undertook training in tissue typing with Paul Terasaki at UCLA School of Medicine. .

Career 
She started an HLA laboratory at the Wellesley Hospital in 1979. She was a staff rheumatologist at Women’s College Hospital from 1978 to 1990 and at the Wellesley Hospital from 1990 to 1995.

She received the 2015 Mentor of the Year Award from the Royal College of Physicians and Surgeons of Canada and the Distinguished Clinical Investigator Award from the American College of Rheumatology in 2018.

She serves on the Medical Board of the National Psoriasis Foundation, which honored her contributions to psoriasis research in 2022.

Selected publications 

A disease activity index for lupus patients. Arthritis & Rheumatism, 35: 630-640. doi:10.1002/art.1780350606
Arthritis & Rheumatism, 54: 2665-2673. doi:10.1002/art.21972
Arthritis & Rheumatism, 39: 363-369. doi:10.1002/art.1780390303

References 

Canadian rheumatologists
Living people
Year of birth missing (living people)
Academic staff of the University of Toronto
Physicians from Ontario
University of Toronto alumni
Canadian women physicians
Fellows of the Royal College of Physicians and Surgeons of Canada
Canadian medical researchers
Women rheumatologists
20th-century Canadian physicians
20th-century women physicians
Women medical researchers